De aansprekers is a novel by Dutch author Maarten 't Hart. It was first published in 1979.

Novels by Maarten 't Hart
1979 novels